Ayirvan may refer to:
Hayravank, Armenia
Yerevan, Armenia